Bison is a Canadian short film, directed by Kevan Funk and released in 2014. A critique of colonialism, the film stars Dylan Playfair as a young man who makes an unsettling discovery while helping to brand cattle on a ranch.

The cast also includes Tyler Burrows, James Michel, Kody Abrahamson, Derek Abrahamson and Kurt Max Runte.

The film premiered at the 2014 Toronto International Film Festival. It was later named to TIFF's annual year-end Canada's Top Ten list of the year's best Canadian short films.

References

External links
 

2014 films
2014 short films
Canadian drama short films
Films directed by Kevan Funk
2010s English-language films
2010s Canadian films